The Ngarla are an Aboriginal Australian people of the Pilbara region of Western Australia.

Country
He set their upriver boundary between Kudingaranga (Mulyie Station) and Tjaljaranja (otherweise known as Taluirina Pool). Their traditional inland extension was said to run up to Yarrie.

Social organisation
The Ngarla had a four class system:-

Males-----Females-----Children.
 Poorungnoo marries a Parrijari producing Kiamoona.
 Banakoomarries a Kiamoona, giving birth to Parrijari
 Parrijari marries Poorungnoo producing Banakoo.
 Kiamoona marries Banakoo producing Poorungnoo.

History of contact
White colonisation of Ngarla domains began in 1864. Over the following two years, smallpox (boola) swept through the area killing off large numbers of Ngarla. By 1886 there were said to be several hundred.

Alternative names
 Nga:la
 Ngala, Ngerla
 Ngurla, Ngirla
 Ngala
 Gnalla
 Ngalana
 Kudjunguru (a Nyamal exonym meaning "coast dwellers")

Some words
  (wild dog)
  (father)
  (mother)
  (white man)

Notes

Citations

Sources

Aboriginal peoples of Western Australia
Mid West (Western Australia)